The 1956 Panamerican Championship was the second edition of the Panamerican Championship, an association football tournament featuring national teams from North, Central and South America. It was held in Mexico City, between February 26 and March 18, in 1956.

The competition, contested by six teams, was played in a round-robin format, and won by Brazil, achieving their second consecutive title. All the matches were played at Estadio Olímpico Universitario.

Venue

Matches

Final table

Top goalscorers

References

1956
1956 Pan
1956 in South American football
1955–56 in Mexican football
February 1956 sports events in Mexico
March 1956 sports events in Mexico
1956 Pan
1950s in Mexico City